George Edward Banks (September 24, 1938 – March 1, 1985) was an American professional baseball player. He was a prolific home run hitter in minor league baseball, smashing 223 homers over an 11-year career in the minors. A third baseman and outfielder, he played 106 games of Major League Baseball during all or parts of five seasons (1962–1966) for the Minnesota Twins and Cleveland Indians.

Banks was born in Pacolet Mills, South Carolina. He signed originally with the New York Yankees in 1957, and made it only to the Eastern League in the Bombers' system.  But after back-to-back minor league seasons in which he hit 29 and 30 home runs, Banks was chosen by the Twins in the 1961 Rule 5 draft and spent the entire  campaign on the Twins' MLB roster. He appeared in 63 games during his rookie season, and batted .252 with four home runs and 15 runs batted in. It was his only full campaign in the Major Leagues. In June 1964 he was part of a key trade, when the Twins sent Banks and pitcher Lee Stange to the Indians for right-handed pitcher Mudcat Grant; Grant would win 21 games and lead the Twins to the 1965 American League championship. Banks played in only 17 games for Cleveland over parts of three seasons, and spent most of the rest of his career in the minors at the Triple-A level. He retired after the 1968 campaign.

George Banks died at age 46 of amyotrophic lateral sclerosis (ALS or Lou Gehrig's Disease). Athletic fields in his native town of Pacolet are named in his memory.

References

External links

1938 births
1985 deaths
Atlanta Crackers players
Baseball players from South Carolina
Binghamton Triplets players
Cleveland Indians players
Dallas Rangers players
Neurological disease deaths in South Carolina
Deaths from motor neuron disease
Fargo-Moorhead Twins players
Greensboro Yankees players
Kearney Yankees players
Major League Baseball third basemen
Major League Baseball outfielders
Minnesota Twins players
People from Pacolet, South Carolina
Portland Beavers players
St. Petersburg Saints players
Seattle Angels players
Spartanburg Phillies players